X. concinna may refer to:

 Xanthoria concinna, a lichenized fungus
 Xenomigia concinna, a Colombian moth